Commander Harry Lewin Lee Pennell (1882 – 31 May 1916) was a Royal Navy officer who served on the Terra Nova Expedition. He was responsible for the first sighting of Oates Coast on 22 February 1911, and named it after Captain Lawrence Oates. He only spent short periods in Antarctica, returning with the Terra Nova to wait out the winters of 1911 and 1912 in Lyttelton, New Zealand. Due to the absence of Robert Falcon Scott on land, Pennell assumed the role of command on the Terra Nova, which would bring fresh supplies back to Antarctica with each voyage.

Despite not being a part of the main landing party for the Pole, Pennell was a popular member of the expedition. Herbert Ponting, the photographer of the expedition, recalled in his book The Great White South that Pennell was "the most energetic man I have ever known....when Pennell was not occupied with navigating problems, he was either on watch, or conning from the crow's-nest, or else out on the yard-arms helping the seaman set or shorten sail, or otherwise assisting in the handling of the ship. He was a 'whale for work' ".

Pennell married Katie Hodson, the sister of his friend from naval college, on 15 April 1915 during his shore leave. Pennell was promoted to Commander and assigned to HMS Queen Mary, dying in her on 31 May 1916 in the Battle of Jutland, when the ship was sunk by the German ships SMS Seydlitz and SMS Derfflinger.

The Pennell Coast of Victoria Land, Antarctica, is named after him.

References

External links
 Harry Pennell collection

1882 births
1916 deaths
British explorers
British military personnel killed in World War I
Explorers of Antarctica
People educated at Exeter School
Royal Navy officers of World War I
Terra Nova expedition